Thomas Ørdal Maale (born 22 October 1974) is a Danish former footballer and physical coach at HB Køge.

He played for a number of Danish clubs including Lyngby BK, Fremad Amager and Hvidovre IF.

In July 2008 he was named new manager of Glostrup FK. He continued as manager of the club, after it merged with Albertslund IF in 2009 to form BGA.

In July 2011 he succeeded Freddy Andersen as manager of Nordvest FC. He left the club in 2013 in order to become physical coach at HB Køge.

References

External links 
DBU Profile

1974 births
Living people
Danish men's footballers
Denmark youth international footballers
Danish football managers
Danish 1st Division players
Lyngby Boldklub players
Ølstykke FC players
Boldklubben af 1893 players
Valur (men's football) players
Hvidovre IF players
Brønshøj Boldklub players
Holbæk B&I managers
Association football forwards
People from Gentofte Municipality
Sportspeople from the Capital Region of Denmark